Andulinang Island is an island in the municipality of Sitangkai, Tawi-Tawi. It is located at the western edge of the Andulinang Reef. It is one of the last islands of the Sulu Archipelago nearest the Philippine-Malaysian border next to Panguan Island and Mardanas Island.

See also

 List of islands of the Philippines
 Panguan Island
 Mardanas Island
 Panampangan Island

References

External links

Andulinang Island at OpenStreetMap

Islands of Tawi-Tawi